The Harbor 14 is an American trailerable sailboat that was designed by Barney Lehman and William D. Schock as a day sailer and first built in 2004.

The Harbor 14 is an updated development of the 1960 Capri 14 keelboat, which was, in turn, derived from the 1958 Lido 14 sailing dinghy.

Production
The design was built by W. D. Schock Corp in the United States, starting in 2004, but it is now out of production.

Design
The Harbor 14 is a recreational keelboat, built predominantly of fiberglass, with wooden trim. It displaces  and carries  of ballast.

It has a fractional sloop rig, a spooned raked stem, an angled transom, a transom-hung rudder controlled by a tiller with an extension and a fixed fin keel. The foredeck is covered and the boat has a long cockpit.

The boat has a draft of  when equipped with the standard keel.

See also
List of sailing boat types

Related development
 Capri 14
 Lido 14

References

External links
 Photo of a Harbor 14

Keelboats
2000s sailboat type designs
Sailing yachts
Trailer sailers
Sailboat type designs by Barney Lehman
Sailboat type designs by William D. Schock
Sailboat types built by W. D. Schock Corp